Masters of the Hemisphere is the first full album by the Athens, Georgia-based indie pop band of the same name. Though it lacks the elaborateness of their follow-up, the heavily concept-based I Am Not A Freemdoom, it still maintains the essential element of the band's indie pop songcraft, drawing comparisons to R.E.M., among others.

Critical reception
AllMusic wrote that "while superficially not all that different from many other Kindercore acts, Masters of the Hemisphere have songwriting smarts and instrumental and arranging chops that set them apart."

Track listing
"West Essex"
"Billy Mitchell"
"Saucy Foreign Lass"
"Meteor"
"Everybody Knows Canada"
"Map"
"She Plays Guitar"
"Your Ship Looks Like A Captain"

Additional information

The Japanese release of the album contained two bonus tracks - 'Going on a Freak to Iceland' (also known as 'Bat', which appears on the Going on a Trek to Iceland 7"), and 'My Crowd' (also known as 'My Cloud', which appears on the Seven Summers compilation).

References

1999 albums